Vargasiella is a genus of flowering plants from the orchid family, Orchidaceae. It contains two species, both endemic to South America: It has been treated as the only genus in the subtribe Vargasiellinae, but more recently has been included in the subtribe Zygopetalinae.

Vargasiella peruviana C.Schweinf. - Peru
Vargasiella venezuelana C.Schweinf. - Venezuela

See also 
 List of Orchidaceae genera

References

External links 
IOSPE photos, Vargasiella peruviana C.Schweinf. 1952

Orchids of South America
Zygopetalinae genera
Zygopetalinae